Lucius Statius Quadratus was a Senator of the Roman Empire. Besides being consul ordinarius with Lucius Cuspius Pactumeius Rufinus  in AD 142, he was proconsul of Asia during the reign of the emperor Marcus Aurelius. Statius Quadratus is best known for presiding over the trial and execution of Polycarp, bishop of Smyrna.

Life 
Statius Quadratus was a native of Athens, and is considered the son of Lucius Statius Aquila, suffect consul in 116. His existence is attested by an inscription recovered from Magnesia ad Sipylum (IGR 3,175).

Date of the trial of Polycarp 
Statius Quadratus' role in the trial of Polycarp provides an important clue to the date of the bishop's martyrdom. Eusebius, in his Chronicle, dates his martyrdom to 166–7; yet a letter describing the events around his death states he was executed on Saturday, Xanthicus 2, i.e. 23 February, in the proconsulship of Statius Quadratus, although two experts have argued independently that Xanthicus 2 should actually be equated to 22 February; moreover, a reference in Aelius Aristides has been used to date Quadratus' tenure to 153–4. Of these, that 23 February fell on a Saturday in 155, and 22 February on a Saturday in 156, has convinced most experts to place Polycarp's death in one of those two years. This has led Géza Alföldy to date Statius Quadratus' tenure to 156/7.

References 

Imperial Roman consuls
Roman governors of Asia
2nd-century Romans
Quadratus, Lucius Statius